Zhu Chen (born March 13, 1976) is a Chinese-born Qatari chess Grandmaster. In 1999, she became China's second women's world chess champion after Xie Jun, and China's 13th Grandmaster. In 2006, she obtained Qatari citizenship and since then plays for Qatar.

Biography
In 1988 Zhu became the first Chinese player to win an international chess competition when she won the World Girls Under-12 Championship in Romania.

She won the World Junior Girls Chess Championship in 1994 and 1996. When she became Grandmaster in 1999, she was the seventh woman to do so.

At the age of 25 she defeated Alexandra Kosteniuk of Russia in a tournament for the 2001/2002 Women's World Chess Championship, by 5–3, becoming the ninth champion.

Zhu gave up the chance to defend her world title in Georgia in May 2004 due to a jammed schedule and her pregnancy.

In June 2004, Zhu played two games against the chess computer "Star of Unisplendour", which was an advanced AMD 64 bit 3400+ CPU and 2 GB RAM combined with the chess engine Fritz 8. She lost both games.

Zhu is married to Qatari Grandmaster Mohamad Al-Modiahki, and now represents Qatar. As of 2010, they have two daughters: Dana (b. 2004) and Hind (b. 2008). She also studied for a master's degree at Tsinghua University.

Performance in competitions
1988.25 July-7 August, World Girls Under 12 Championship. 1st place - Romania

1990.5–19 September, Chinese National Women's Individual Championship "Group B".1st place - China

1991, Chinese National Women's Individual Championship. 2nd place - Chengdu China

1992. September, Chinese National Women's Individual Championship. 1st place - Beijing China

1994.1–26 May, Chinese National Women's Individual Championship. 1st place - Beijing China
 
1994. June, Asian Girls Junior Chess Championship. 1st place - Shah Alam  Malaysia

1994. September, World Girls Junior Chess Championship. 1st place - Matinhos Brazil

1994.1–15 December, The 15th World Women's Olympiad team championship. 3rd place -Moscow Russia

1996.14–27 May, Chinese National Individual Championship. 1st place - Tianjin  China

1996.14 September-2 October，The 16th World Women's Olympiad team championship. 2nd place - Yerevan  Armenia

1996.9–22 November, World Girls Junior Chess Championship. 1st place - Medellin  Colombia

1997.15–26 May, Chinese National Men's Individual Championship. 2nd place - Beijing China

1998 29 September-12 October, The 17th World Women's Olympiad team championship. 1st place - Russia　
 
2000.28 November - 12 December, The 18th World Women's Olympiad team championship. 1st place - Istanbul Turkey

2001.27 November-13 December，World Women's Individual Championship. 1st place - Moscow Russia　

2002. March. FIDE Grand Prix, Zhu was able to claim the win and knock Ruslan Ponomariov out of the tournament. This is possibly the only female player to ever beat the male world champion in any competitive sport. - Dubai UAE

2002, World Women's Olympiad team championship. 1st place - Slovenia

2005. March, Accoona Women's World Rapid Chess Championship. 1st place - New York, USA

2006. July, The North Urals Cup. 2nd place - Krasnoturinsk Russia

2006，Asian game Women's Individual. 3rd place - Doha Qatar

2007.July, The North Urals Cup. 1st place - Krasnoturinsk Russia

2007. November, Asian Indoor Games Women's Individual Rapid Championship. 1st place；Asian Indoor Games Women's Individual Blitz Championship. 2nd place - Macau

2009. November, Asian Indoor Games Women's Individual Rapid Championship. 2nd place - Ha Long Vietnam

2010. November, Guangzhou Asian game Women's Individual. 8th place - Guangzhou China

2011. December, Arab Games Women's Individual Chess Championship. 1st place; Arab Games Women's Individual Rapid Chess Championship. 1st place;Arab Games Women's Individual Blitz Chess Championship. 1st place - Doha Qatar

China Chess League
Zhu Chen plays for Zhejiang chess club in the China Chess League (CCL).

See also
Chess in China

References

External links

 
 
 
 

Living people
1976 births
Chess grandmasters
Female chess grandmasters
Chess woman grandmasters
Chinese female chess players
Sportspeople from Wenzhou
Qatari female chess players
Qatari people of Chinese descent
Women's world chess champions
World Junior Chess Champions
World Youth Chess Champions
Asian Games medalists in chess
Naturalised citizens of Qatar
Chinese emigrants to Qatar
Chess players from Zhejiang
Tsinghua University alumni
Chess players at the 2006 Asian Games
Chess players at the 2010 Asian Games
Asian Games bronze medalists for Qatar
Medalists at the 2006 Asian Games